Râmești may refer to several places in Romania:

 Râmești, a village in the town of Horezu, Vâlcea County
 Râmești, a village in Șușani Commune, Vâlcea County
 Râmești (river), a tributary of the Pârâul Urșanilor in Vâlcea County